Lewis Emery Jr. (1839–1924) was a New York-born businessman and politician who was active in the Commonwealth of Pennsylvania.

Biography
Lewis Emery Jr. was the son of Lewis Sr. and Maria (Gilson) Emery; born at Cherry Creek Township, Chautauqu Co., New York, 10 August 1839.  He moved with parents to Michigan; attended common schools; pursued a career as a miller; moved to Pennsylvania and engaged in the oil business in Titusville; moved again to Bradford, McKean County, 1875; member of the House of Representatives, 1879; state Senate, 1880–1888; became a wealthy oil man and industrialist, and 1906 Reform Republican candidate for Governor.  He married at age 78, Eleta Card of New York City. He died in New York City, 19 November 1924; age 85. [Note: The Pennsylvania State Senate website biography incorrectly cites the death date as 8 November 1941.]

Burial
Emery is interred in the Emery mausoleum at Oak Hill Cemetery, Bradford, Pennsylvania. Services were held on 22 November 1924. Much of the business district shut down to honor the funeral procession.

Commemoration
Emery was the namesake for a World War II Liberty ship, the SS Lewis Emery Jr., launched in 1943.

References

1839 births
1924 deaths
Republican Party Pennsylvania state senators
Republican Party members of the Pennsylvania House of Representatives
19th-century American politicians